Kingsdown may refer to:

Places
England
Kingsdown, Bristol, a suburb
Kingsdown, Dover, a village in east Kent
West Kingsdown, north Kent
Kingsdown, Swale, a hamlet on the North Downs in Kent
Kingsdown, Swindon, a suburb of Swindon in Wiltshire
Kingsdown, Box, a hamlet in Wiltshire

United States
Kingsdown, Kansas

People
Thomas Pemberton Leigh, 1st Baron Kingsdown, a hereditary peer of England
Robin Leigh-Pemberton, Baron Kingsdown, a life peer of England

See also 
Kingsdown Camp, a hill fort in Somerset, England
Kingsdown School, in Swindon, England